Massimo De Luca (born 7 October 1987), is an Italian futsal player who plays for Asti and the Italian national futsal team.

References

External links
UEFA profile

1987 births
Living people
Sportspeople from Naples
Italian men's futsal players